This is a list of the described species of the harvestman family Podoctidae. The data is taken from Joel Hallan's Biology Catalog.

Erecananinae
Erecananinae Roewer, 1912

 Erecanana Strand, 1911
 Erecanana defensa Goodnight & Goodnight, 1959
 Erecanana dentipes H. Kauri, 1985 — Zaire
 Erecanana insulana Roewer, 1949 — Réunion
 Erecanana lentiginosa Lawrence, 1962
 Erecanana mordax (Sørensen, 1910) — Tanzania (Usambara Mountains)
 Erecanana quadridens Lawrence, 1962
 Erecanana remyi (Roewer, 1949) — Madagascar
 Erecanana subinermis Caporiacco, 1947
 Erecanana typus (Sørensen, 1910)

 Iyonus Suzuki, 1964 — Japan
 Iyonus yuyama Suzuki, 1964

 Lomanius Roewer, 1923
 Lomanius tridens (Loman, 1905) — Java
 Lomanius brevipalpus (Goodnight & Goodnight, 1948) — Palau
 Lomanius carinatus Suzuki, 1976
 Lomanius formosae Roewer, 1912 — Taiwan
 Lomanius longipalpus (Goodnight & Goodnight, 1948) — Palau
 Lomanius longipalpus Goodnight & Goodnight, 1957 (preoccupied)
 Lomanius longipalpus longipalpus Goodnight & Goodnight, 1957
 Lomanius longipalpus mindanaoensis Suzuki, 1977
 Lomanius minimus Roewer, 1926
 Lomanius rectipes (Roewer, 1963)

Ibaloniinae
Ibaloniinae Roewer, 1912

 Asproleria Roewer, 1949
 Asproleria albituberculata Roewer, 1949 — New Guinea

 Austribalonius Forster, 1955
 Austribalonius horridus Forster, 1955 — Australia

 Bonea Roewer, 1913
 Bonea sarasinorum Roewer, 1913 — Sulawesi
 Bonea albertus (Roewer, 1949) — Borneo
 Bonea armatissimus (Roewer, 1949) — Borneo
 Bonea cippatus Roewer, 1927 — Philippines
 Bonea longipalpis Suzuki, 1977
 Bonea palpalis (Roewer, 1949) — Java
 Bonea scopulata (Roewer, 1949) — Singapore
 Bonea silvestris (Roewer, 1949) — Sarawak (Borneo)

 Eusitalces Roewer, 1915
 Eusitalces parvulus Roewer, 1915 — Sri Lanka

 Gargenna Roewer, 1949
 Gargenna coronata Roewer, 1949 — Indonesia

 Heteroibalonius Goodnight & Goodnight, 1947
 Heteroibalonius malkini Goodnight & Goodnight, 1947

 Heteropodoctis Roewer, 1912
 Heteropodoctis quinquespinosus (Roewer, 1911) — New Guinea

 Holozoster Loman, 1902
 Holozoster ovalis Loman, 1902 — Seychelles

 Ibalonianus Roewer, 1923
 Ibalonianus quadriguttatus (Hirst, 1912) — Maluku Islands (Indonesia)
 Ibalonianus kueckenthali (Hirst, 1912) — Maluku Islands
 Ibalonianus impudens (Loman, 1906) — New Guinea
 Ibalonianus prasinus Roewer, 1949 — New Guinea
 Ibalonianus rainbowi (Forster, 1949) — Solomons
 Ibalonianus waigenensis Roewer, 1949 — Indonesia
 Ibalonianus venator Roewer, 1949 — New Guinea

 Ibalonius Karsch, 1880
 Ibalonius jagori Karsch, 1880 — Luzon (Philippines)
 Ibalonius annulipes (Sørensen, 1886) — New Caledonia
 Ibalonius breoni (Simon, 1879) — Réunion
 Ibalonius dubius (Goodnight & Goodnight, 1948) — Russell Islands
 Ibalonius ferrugineum (Roewer, 1912) — Philippines
 Ibalonius flavopictum Hirst, 1911 — Seychelles
 Ibalonius impudens Loman, 1906 — New Guinea
 Ibalonius inscriptus Loman, 1902 — Seychelles
 Ibalonius karschii Loman, 1902 — Seychelles
 Ibalonius lomani Hirst, 1911 — Seychelles
 Ibalonius maculatus (Roewer, 1915) — New Guinea
 Ibalonius sarasinorum Roewer, 1913 — Sulawesi
 Ibalonius semperi (Roewer, 1912) — Philippines
 Ibalonius semperi semperi (Roewer, 1912)
 Ibalonius semperi apoensis Suzuki, 1977
 Ibalonius simoni Roewer, 1916 — New Guinea
 Ibalonius spinigerum (Sørensen, 1886) — New Caledonia
 Ibalonius tuberculatus Suzuki, 1977
 Ibalonius umbonatus (Roewer, 1927) — Philippines

 Ibantila Silhavy, 1969
 Ibantila cubana Silhavy, 1969 — Cuba

 Leytpodoctis J. Martens, 1993
 Leytpodoctis oviger J. Martens, 1993 — Philippines

 Mesoceratula Roewer, 1949
 Mesoceratula spinigera (Sørensen, in L. Koch 1886)

 Metibalonius Roewer, 1915
 Metibalonius abnormis (Roewer, 1915) —  New Guinea (preoccupied by Ibalonius abnormis or placed in Sitalcicus?)
 Metibalonius abnormis (Strand, 1910) — New Guinea
 Metibalonius biantipalpis (Roewer, 1915) — New Guinea
 Metibalonius spinulatus (Roewer, 1915) — New Guinea
 Metibalonius cervicornis (Strand, 1910) — New Guinea
 Metibalonius eskaii Suzuki, 1941 — Caroline Islands
 Metibalonius esakii Goodnight & Goodnight, 1957 (preoccupied)
 Metibalonius femoralis (Roewer, 1949) — New Guinea
 Metibalonius gracilipes Roewer, 1915 — New Guinea
 Metibalonius longipalpis Roewer, 1915 — New Guinea
 Metibalonius obscurus (Roewer, 1915) — New Guinea
 Metibalonius oppositus (Roewer, 1927) — Borneo
 Metibalonius scaber (Roewer, 1915) — New Guinea
 Metibalonius spinata (Roewer, 1949) — Indonesia
 Metibalonius strucki Goodnight & Goodnight, 1947 — New Guinea
 Metibalonius tenuis (Roewer, 1949) — Sulawesi
 Metibalonius yalomensis S. Suzuki, 1982 — Bismarck Archipelago

 Orobunus Goodnight & Goodnight, 1947
 Orobunus quadrispinosus Goodnight & Goodnight, 1947

 Paramesoceras Roewer, 1915
 Paramesoceras novoguineensis Roewer, 1915 — New Guinea

 Pentacros Roewer, 1949
 Pentacros margaritatus Roewer, 1949 — Indonesia

 Podoctinus Roewer, 1923
 Podoctinus willeyi (Hirst, 1912) — New Britain

 Proholozoster Roewer, 1915
 Proholozoster neoguinensis Roewer, 1915 — New Guinea

 Santobius Roewer, 1949
 Santobius spinitarsus Roewer, 1949 — New Hebrides

 Sitalcicus Roewer, 1923
 Sitalcicus gardineri (Hirst, 1911) — Seychelles
 Sitalcicus novemtuberculatus (Simon, 1879) — Réunion
 Sitalcicus incertus M. Rambla, 1983 — Seychelles

Podoctinae
Podoctinae Roewer, 1912

 Baramella Roewer, 1949
 Baramella quadrispina (Roewer, 1915) — Borneo

 Baramia Hirst, 1912
 Baramia echinosa Banks, 1931 — Sarawak
 Baramia longipes Banks, 1931 — Sarawak
 Baramia solitaria Roewer, 1949 — Indonesia
 Baramia vorax Hirst, 1912 — Borneo

 Baso Roewer, 1923
 Baso jacobsoni Roewer, 1923 — Sumatra

 Basoides Roewer, 1949
 Basoides mucronatus (Roewer, 1927) — Sumatra

 Bistota Roewer, 1927
 Bistota horrida Roewer, 1927 — Bombay

 Centrobunus Loman, 1902
 Centrobunus braueri Loman, 1902 — Seychelles

 Dino Loman, in Weber 1892
 Dino weberi Loman, in Weber 1892 — Sumatra

 Dongmoa Roewer, 1927
 Dongmoa silvestrii Roewer, 1927 — Tonking
 Dongmoa oshimensis Suzuki, 1964

 Eupodoctis Roewer, 1923
 Eupodoctis indicus (Hirst, 1911) — India
 Eupodoctis annulatipes (Roewer, 1912) — Sri Lanka

 Eurytromma Roewer, 1949
 Eurytromma pictulus (Pocock, 1903) — Sri Lanka

 Gaditusa Roewer, 1949
 Gaditusa coxalis Roewer, 1949 — Borneo

 Hoplodino Roewer, 1915
 Hoplodino continentalis Roewer, 1915 — Singapore, Malacca
 Hoplodino hoogstraali Suzuki, 1977
 Hoplodino gapensis Suzuki, 1972
 Hoplodino longipalpis Roewer, 1949 — Sulawesi

 Idjena Roewer, 1927
 Idjena dammermani Roewer, 1927 — Java

 Idzubius Roewer, 1949
 Idzubius akiyamae (Hirst, 1911) — Japan

 Japetus Roewer, 1949
 Japetus longipes Roewer, 1949 — Borneo

 Laponcea Roewer, 1936
 Laponcea cippata Roewer, 1936 — Mauritius

 Lejokus Roewer, 1949
 Lejokus silvestris Roewer, 1949 — Borneo

 Lundulla Roewer, 1927
 Lundulla bifurcata Roewer, 1927 — Borneo

 Metapodoctis Roewer, 1915
 Metapodoctis formosae Roewer, 1915 — Taiwan
 Metapodoctis siamensis S. Suzuki, 1985 — Thailand

 Neopodoctis Roewer, 1912
 Neopodoctis ceylonensis Roewer, 1912 — Sri Lanka
 Neopodoctis taprobanicus (Hirst, 1912) — Sri Lanka

 Oppodoctis Roewer, 1927
 Oppodoctis armatus Roewer, 1927 — Philippines

 Peromona Roewer, 1949
 Peromona erinacea Roewer, 1949 — Seychelles

 Podoctellus Roewer, 1949
 Podoctellus johorensis Roewer, 1949 — Johore

 Podoctis Thorell, 1890
 Podoctis armatissimus Thorell, 1890 — Pinang

 Podoctomma Roewer, 1949
 Podoctomma javanum Roewer, 1949 — Java

 Podoctops Roewer, 1949
 Podoctops multimaculatum Roewer, 1949 — Sumatra

 Pumbaraius Roewer, 1927
 Pumbaraius kempi Roewer, 1927 — India
 Pumbaraius malabarensis Roewer, 1949 — India

 Sibolgia Roewer, 1923
 Sibolgia jacobsoni Roewer, 1923 — Sumatra

 Stobitus Roewer, 1949
 Stobitus spinipes Roewer, 1949 — Malaya

 Tandikudius Roewer, 1929
 Tandikudius rugosus Roewer, 1929 — India

 Trencona Roewer, 1949
 Trencona setipes Roewer, 1949 — Borneo

 Trigonobunus Loman, 1894
 Trigonobunus spinifer Loman, 1894 — Borneo

 Tryssetus Roewer, 1936
 Tryssetus spinarmatus Roewer, 1936 — Mauritius

 Vandaravua Roewer, 1929
 Vandaravua carli Roewer, 1929 — India

References
 Joel Hallan's Biology Catalog: Podoctidae

Podoctidae
Podoctidae